Eduardo Sánchez may refer to:
Eduardo Sánchez (composer)
Eduardo Sánchez (baseball) (born 1989), Venezuelan baseball pitcher. 
Eduardo Sánchez (director) (born 1968), Cuban-born American director
Eduardo Andrade Sánchez (born 1948), Mexican politician
Eduardo Zarzosa Sánchez (born 1973), Mexican politician
Eduardo Ávila Sánchez (born 1986), Mexican Paralympic judoka